Ploceidae is a family of small passerine birds, many of which are called weavers, weaverbirds, weaver finches and bishops. These names come from the nests of intricately woven vegetation created by  birds in this family. In most recent classifications, Ploceidae is a clade, which excludes some birds that have historically been placed in the family, such as some of the sparrows, but which includes the monotypic subfamily Amblyospizinae. The family is believed to have originated in the mid-Miocene. All birds of the Ploceidae are native to the Old World, most in Africa south of the Sahara, though a few live in tropical areas of Asia. A few species have been introduced outside their native range.

Taxonomy and systematics
The family Ploceidae was introduced (as Ploceïdes) by the Swedish zoologist Carl Jakob Sundevall in 1836. Phylogenetic studies have shown that the family is sister to a clade containing the families Viduidae and Estrildidae Their common ancestor lived in the middle Miocene around 18 million years ago.

A 2017 molecular phylogenetic study by Thilina de Silva and collaborators as well as an expanded study by the same group published in 2019 have indicated that the genus Ploceus as currently defined is polyphyletic. A cladogram based on these results is shown below.

Genera
The family includes 15 genera with a total of 126 species. For more detail, see list of Ploceidae species.

Description
The males of many species in this family are brightly coloured, usually in red or yellow and black. Some species show variation in colour only in the breeding season. These are seed-eating birds with rounded conical bills.

Distribution and habitat
The weaverbird colonies may be found close to bodies of water.

Behaviour and ecology
Weavers are named for their elaborately woven nests. The nests vary in size, shape, material used, and construction techniques from species to species. Materials used for building nests include fine leaf fibers, grass, and twigs. Many species weave very fine nests using thin strands of leaf fiber, though some, like the buffalo-weavers, form massive untidy stick nests in their colonies, which may have spherical woven nests within. The sociable weavers of Africa build apartment-house nests, in which 100 to 300 pairs have separate flask-shaped chambers entered by tubes at the bottom. The sparrow weavers live in family units that employ cooperative breeding.
Most species weave nests that have narrow entrances, facing downward.

Many weaver species are gregarious and breed colonially. The birds build their nests together for protection, often several to a branch. Usually the male birds weave the nests and use them as a form of display to lure prospective females.

Relationship to humans
They sometimes cause crop damage, notably the red-billed quelea, reputed to be the world's most numerous bird.

Gallery

References

Further reading

External links

 
Bird families